Rice Hall is a building on the Cornell University campus that was listed on the National Register of Historic Places in 1984.

It is a three-story rectangular building.  Its first floor is built with rusticated brick imitating clapboards, and has coursed brickwork above.  It has a slate roof.

Its eligibility for LEED certification is under review.

References

Cornell University buildings
University and college buildings on the National Register of Historic Places in New York (state)
National Register of Historic Places in Tompkins County, New York
1911 establishments in New York (state)